Esinencu (or Esinenco) is a family name which may refer to:
 Nicolae Esinencu (1940–2016), Moldovan screenwriter and writer
 Nicoleta Esinencu (b. 1978), Moldovan playwright

Romanian-language surnames